Danielle Watts (born 13 October 1980) is a British Paralympic swimmer who represented Great Britain at three Paralympic Games from 2000 to 2008 winning three medals. She is classified as an S1 category swimmer.

At the 2000 Paralympic Games in Sydney, Watts competed in the women's 50 and 100 m freestyle and 50 m backstroke (all S2 category). She repeated these events at the 2004 Games in Athens, this time winning silver in the 100 m freestyle (S2) and bronze in both the 50 m freestyle (S2) and 50 m backstroke (S2).

She swam in two events at the 2008 Beijing Paralympic Games, finishing 7th in the 50 m backstroke (S2) and 13th in the 50 m freestyle (S3).

She is the current world record holder for the S1 category over 50, 100, and 200 m freestyle and 100 m backstroke.

In 2003, she was awarded Swimming World Magazine Swimming World's World Disabled Swimmers of the Year.

Danielle married Jamie Swann in 2011 and changed her own surname to Swann. She is a Christian and, in 2011, appeared on BBC News talking about unsuitable housing conditions for disabled people.

References

 http://www.baptisttimes.co.uk/index.php/baptisms-testimonies/118-british-paralympics-triple-medallist-takes-to-the-waters-again-

External links
British Swimming athlete profile

1980 births
Paralympic swimmers of Great Britain
Swimmers at the 2000 Summer Paralympics
Swimmers at the 2004 Summer Paralympics
Swimmers at the 2008 Summer Paralympics
Paralympic silver medalists for Great Britain
Paralympic bronze medalists for Great Britain
World record holders in paralympic swimming
Living people
Medalists at the 2004 Summer Paralympics
British female freestyle swimmers
Paralympic medalists in swimming
S2-classified Paralympic swimmers